Kathleen Horvath and Yvonne Vermaak were the defending champions but lost in the semifinals to Ivanna Madruga-Osses and Catherine Tanvier.

Virginia Ruzici and Virginia Wade won in the final 6–3, 2–6, 6–1 against Madruga-Osses and Tanvier.

Seeds
Champion seeds are indicated in bold text while text in italics indicates the round in which those seeds were eliminated.

Draw

Final

Top half

Bottom half

External links
 1983 Italian Open Women's Doubles Draw

Women's Doubles
1983 in Italian women's sport